Smash Rockwell is a studio album by American hip hop musician Casual. It was released on Hiero Imperium on September 6, 2005.

Critical reception

Andy Kellman of AllMusic gave the album 3.5 stars out of 5, writing, "The album is fairly uniform and consistently strong, despite the range of producers involved, and Casual is in improved form lyrically, nearly as sharp as he was throughout 1994's Fear Itself." He added, "All the talk of taking things back to the early '90s can become nearly as grating as relentless gun talk, but Casual is thankfully less irritable than he was on He Think He Raw." Dan Nishimoto of Stylus Magazine gave the album a grade of C+, stating, "When the grab-bag approach works, it certainly works to his advantage; from pimp strut to battlecat posturing, he gets to bake and taste the cake."

Spence D. of IGN included it on the "Top 26 Albums of 2005" list.

Track listing

Personnel
Credits adapted from liner notes.

 Casual – vocals, production (4, 12, 14), executive production
 J-Zone – production (1, 10)
 Domino – production (2, 5), executive production
 Bedrock – production (3)
 E Mac – vocals (4)
 Too Short – vocals (4)
 G Stack – vocals (4)
 Richie Rich – vocals (4)
 Psalm One – vocals (6)
 Jake One – production (6, 8)
 Compound 7 – production (7, 15)
 E-40 – vocals (8)
 Dan the Automator – production (9)
 Opio – vocals (10)
 Tajai – vocals (10)
 Quincy Jones – production (11)
 Young Zee – vocals (13)
 Dante Ross – production (13)
 Oh, So Nappy! – design
 James Patrick Dawson – photography
 Ian Davis – executive production

References

External links
 

2005 albums
Casual (rapper) albums
Hieroglyphics Imperium Recordings albums
Albums produced by Dan the Automator
Albums produced by Jake One
Albums produced by J-Zone
Albums produced by Quincy Jones